Nornalup is a small town located in the Shire of Denmark in the Great Southern region of Western Australia. The town is located along the South Coast Highway and on the banks of the Frankland River. The name derives from the local indigenous language: "place of the black snake" - Norne - meaning "black snake" (a.k.a. tiger snake) - and up meaning "place of". The area attracts considerable numbers of tiger snakes due to its proximity to the river and wetlands, though fewer now than in the past. Anecdotal evidence from early settlers mentions uncomfortably large numbers of these highly venomous and aggressive reptiles, particularly during spring and early summer.

References 

Great Southern (Western Australia)
Coastal towns in Western Australia